Aaahh Belinda is a 1986 Turkish fantastic comedy film, directed by Atıf Yılmaz, featuring Müjde Ar as a young actress appearing in a TV-commercial for a shampoo, who finds herself transported into the role she plays. The film screened in competition at the 23rd Antalya Golden Orange Film Festival, where it won Golden Oranges for Best Film, Best Director and Best Actress.

Synopsis 
Serap, a young actress with a strong, lively personality and a special dislike for middle-class family life, takes part in a TV commercial for a recently marketed shampoo, "Belinda". She plays the role of a typical housewife called Naciye. During one of the rehearsals, she suddenly finds that the stage has disappeared, the crew has vanished and all the elements of the script have become real. Now she is Naciye. No one around recognizes her as Serap anymore. Even worse, her family thinks that she is suffering from depression, while Serap desperately tries to prove otherwise.

Cast 
Müjde Ar - Serap
 - Suat
Macit Koper - Hulusi
Güzin Özipek
Füsun Demirel - Feride
Tarık Papuççuoğlu
Mehmet Akan
Levend Yılmaz
Fatoş Sezer
Burçak Çerezcioğlu - little girl of the family

External links 
 

1986 films
1980s fantasy comedy-drama films
Films set in Turkey
Films shot in Turkey
Golden Orange Award for Best Film winners
Turkish fantasy comedy-drama films
1980s Turkish-language films